The Stonington First Methodist Episcopal Church is a church at 48854 County Road X in Walsh, Colorado.  It was built in 1917 and was added to the National Register of Historic Places in 1996.

It is a one-story, front-gabled, wood-frame structure with elements of Gothic Revival style. It has pointed-arched windows and a bell tower. It is built on a concrete block foundation and has clapboard siding.

References

External links

 Let's Talk Heritage - Southeast Colorado 

Methodist churches in Colorado
Churches on the National Register of Historic Places in Colorado
Gothic Revival church buildings in Colorado
Churches completed in 1917
Buildings and structures in Baca County, Colorado
1917 establishments in Colorado
National Register of Historic Places in Baca County, Colorado